Traces of Light (Spanish:Huella de luz) is a 1943 Spanish comedy film directed by Rafael Gil on his directing debut. It is based on a novel by Wenceslao Fernández Flórez.

Plot 
Octavio Saldaña is a poor young dreamer who lives with his elderly mother and is an office worker at Manufacturas Sánchez-Bey. Mr. Bey rewards Octavio for his work by inviting him to spend a few days at a spa. There Octavio meets Lelly, daughter of a cloth manufacture, and to impress her he decides to pass himself off as a millionaire.

Cast
 Isabel de Pomés as Lelly Medina
 Antonio Casal as Octavio Saldaña
 Juan Espantaleón as Sánchez Bey
 Camino Garrigó as Madre de Octavio
 Juan Calvo as Mike
 Fernando Freyre de Andrade as Moke
 Mary Delgado as Rosario
 Nicolás D. Perchicot as Mayordomo
 Ramón Martori as Medina
 Julio Infiesta as Jacobito
 José Prada as Cañete
 Alejandro Nolla as Gerente del hotel
 Ana María Campoy as Isabel
 Francisco Hernández as Don Eduardo
 Joaquín Torréns as Conserje
 Fernando Porredón as Emilio

References

Bibliography
 Bentley, Bernard. A Companion to Spanish Cinema. Boydell & Brewer 2008.

External links
 

1943 films
1940s Spanish-language films
Spanish black-and-white films
Films based on Spanish novels
Spain in fiction
Films directed by Rafael Gil
1943 comedy films
Films scored by Juan Quintero Muñoz
Spanish comedy films
1940s Spanish films